Crin may refer to:

Crinoline
Child Rights Information Network
Cocoa Research Institute of Nigeria
Crin Antonescu, Romanian politician